Veronica Servente (born 9 March 1977) is an Italian gymnast. She competed in five events at the 1992 Summer Olympics.

Eponymous skill
Servente has one eponymous skill listed in the Code of Points.

References

External links
 

1977 births
Living people
Italian female artistic gymnasts
Olympic gymnasts of Italy
Gymnasts at the 1992 Summer Olympics
Sportspeople from Turin
Originators of elements in artistic gymnastics